Journal of Research on Adolescence is a peer-reviewed academic journal published quarterly by Wiley-Blackwell on behalf of the Society for Research on Adolescence. The editor-in-chief is Amanda Sheffield Morris. The journal covers research on adolescence using both quantitative and qualitative methodologies applied to cognitive, physical, emotional, and social development and behavior. According to the Journal Citation Reports, the journal has a 2021 impact factor of 3.563, ranking it 9th out of 48 journals in the category "Family Studies" and  29th out of 80 journals in the category "Psychology, Developmental".

Previous (associate) editors of the journal included Jacquelynne Eccles, Stephen T. Russell, Nancy Guerra, René Veenstra, Sandra Graham, and Noel A. Card.

References

External links 
 
 Society for Research on Adolescence

Adolescence journals
English-language journals
Publications established in 1991
Quarterly journals
Wiley-Blackwell academic journals